Victor Brooke Miller (born May 14, 1940) is an American writer for film and television. He is best known for his screenplay of the original Friday the 13th film, the popularity of which spawned a long series of sequels. Miller was not involved with any of the sequels, though he remains credited for creating the characters of Jason Voorhees, his mother Pamela, and the heroine Alice Hardy.

He has also written for several daytime television series, for which he has won three Daytime Emmy Awards. His television work includes Guiding Light, One Life to Live, Another World, and All My Children. Much of his tenure of several shows has been working under head writer Megan McTavish.

Early life
Miller was born in New Orleans, Louisiana, the son of John Dabney and Barbara Leovy Miller. He attended Milton Academy in Milton, Massachusetts, and Yale in New Haven, Connecticut, where he says he took every creative writing course offered. Beginning in 1962, he worked in TV programming for a year with Stuart Erwin, Lee Rich, Irwin Segelstein, and Phil Capice at Benton & Bowles Advertising in New York City. He co-founded of the American Shakespeare Theatre's Center for Theatre Techniques in Education and attended Herbert Berghof's playwriting class in New York City.

Directing and writing career
Friday the 13th is Miller's most successful film, grossing $59,754,601 worldwide on a very low budget of $550,000. The original is the only one of the series that had Miller's involvement; it grew into a long series of sequels and became the highest grossing horror franchise in the United States, earning a worldwide total of $465,239,523.

Miller says he hasn't seen any of the other Friday the 13th films because he does not approve of Jason Voorhees being the killer rather than Jason's mother as she was in the original. Miller has been involved in a protracted lawsuit to gain the rights to the first Friday the 13th film.  The issue turned on whether Miller's was a "work for hire", resolved on September 30, 2021, when the United States Court of Appeals for the Second Circuit decided otherwise; consequently, Miller had the right to terminate rights to his work.  For Copyright Act purposes, as a screenwriter, Victor Miller was an independent contractor of the film production company (Manny, Inc.) in 1979, when Miller wrote the screenplay (the film was released in 1980).  The court concluded that copyright law, not labor law, controlled the "work for hire" determination, and thus affirmed the district court's grant of summary judgment to Miller.

He adapted two novels into films: A Stranger Is Watching by Mary Higgins Clark was adapted into the 1982 film of the same name and the 1967 young adult novel The Black Pearl by Scott O'Dell into the 1977 film of the same name. His horror film Rock Paper Dead was released in 2018 and he has co-written the script for the horror thriller Eden Falls.

Awards and nominations

Daytime Emmy Awards

Nominations
(1990, 1999, 2001, 2002 & 2004; Best Writing; All My Children)
(1994 & 1996; Best Writing; Another World)
(1983; Best Writing; One Life to Live)

Wins
(1985, 1988 & 1998; Best Writing; All My Children)

Writers Guild of America Award

Nominations
(1989 & 1999 Season; All My Children)
(1997 Season; Guiding Light)
(1993-1995 Season; Another World)

Wins
WIN (1998, 2000, 2001 & 2003 Season; All My Children)

Personal life
Miller is the third of four children. He married Elizabeth (Tina) Couzens Thurston in 1962.

Books
He was the author of several books titled, Telly Salavas Kojak in a numbered series. The books were published in New York by Pocket Books between 1974 through 1975. Several reprints were published by Star Books in the U.K. without the series number, but with same title. The series:
 1974, Kojak #1: Siege
 1974, Kojak #2: Requiem for a Cop
 1975, Kojak #3: Girl in the River
 1975, Kojak #4: Therapy in Dynamite
 1975, Kojak #5: Death Is Not a Passing Grade
 1975, Kojak #6: A Very Deadly Game
 1975, Kojak #7: Take-Over
 1975, Kojak #8: Gun Business
 1975, Kojak #9: The Trade-off

Other books:
1976, Fernanda, Pocket Books
1978, Hide The Children, Ballantine Books
1978, Giving In To Get Your Way: The attack-tics system for winning your everyday battles, Delacorte Press
1979, Toga Party, Fawcett Books
1979, The Glory Sharer, Jove Books
1981, Angel's Blood, Playboy Press
1981, The Book Of Worries: Hundreds of Horrible Things that Can Happen to You, Warner Books
1983, Windborne, Bantam Books
1993, Aikido In Everyday Life: Giving In to Get Your Way, North Atlantic Books, Berkeley, California Reprint of 1978 with Terry Dobson co-author.
American Dynasty (3 volumes), Dell Books

Filmography
The Black Pearl (1977)
Manny's Orphans (1978)
Here Come the Tigers (1979)
Friday the 13th (1980)
A Stranger Is Watching (1982)
Getting In (1994)
Jury Duty (1995)
On the Edge (2001)
Rock, Paper, Scissors (2017)
Eden Falls (2019)
The Once and Future Smash (2022)

Television
All My Children
Associate head writer: 1984–1986, 1987–1989, 1997–2001, July 2003 – July 10, 2006
Another World
Associate head writer: 1990–1995
General Hospital
Associate head writer: 2001–2002
Guiding Light
Associate head writer: 1986–1987, 1995–1997
One Life to Live
Associate head writer: 1982–1984
Crystal Lake (TV Series)

References

External links

13 Questions with Victor Miller

1940 births
Living people
20th-century American screenwriters
21st-century American screenwriters
American soap opera writers
American male screenwriters
Daytime Emmy Award winners
Writers from New Orleans
Writers Guild of America Award winners
American male television writers
Screenwriters from Louisiana
Milton Academy alumni
Yale College alumni